Qishuyan District was a district of the city of Changzhou in Jiangsu, China. The local language is the Changzhou dialect of Wu Chinese. The postal code for the district is 213011. It covers an area of 31.58 square kilometers. In 2005 the total population was recorded at 80,200 people. It is also home to Tianmu Lake after which a local beer is named. On May 7, 2015, Qishuyan was merged into Wujin District.

References

County-level divisions of Jiangsu
Changzhou